List of Galicia (Eastern Europe) Jews – Jews born in Galicia (Eastern Europe) or identifying themselves as Galitzianer. Those born after the Congress of Vienna would be considered subjects of the Austrian empire and those after the foundation of the dual monarchy in 1867 and before the end of World War I in 1918, would have been Austro-Hungarian citizens.

Religious figures
 Eliezer Adler, founder of the Jewish Community in Gateshead, England
 Yosef Babad
 Josef Samuel Bloch
 Zvi Hirsch Chajes
 Elimelech of Lizhensk
 Jacob Frank, Jewish messianic claimant who combined Judaism and Christianity
 Ben Zion Halberstam, second Rebbe of Bobov
 Chaim Halberstam of Sanz
 Naftali Halberstam, fourth Rebbe of Bobov
 Shlomo Halberstam, first Rebbe of Bobov
 Arthur Hertzberg
 Tzvi Hirsh of Zidichov
 Nachman Krochmal
 Hirschel Levin, Chief Rabbi at London and Berlin
 Roza Pomerantz-Meltzer (1861–1934), writer, Zionist, women's rights activist
 Samuel Judah Löb Rapoport (Shir)
 Shalom Rokeach, first Rebbe of Belz (Hasidic dynasty)
 Yehoshua Rokeach, second Rebbe of Belz
 Yissachar Dov Rokeach, third Rebbe of Belz
 Aharon Rokeach, fourth Rebbe of Belz
 Malka Rokeach, first rebbetzin of Belz
 Mordechai Rokeach, Rav of Bilgoray
 Sholom Mordechai Schwadron
 Meir Shapiro, Hasidic rabbi and rosh yeshiva
 Dov Berish Weidenfeld
 Mendel Weinbach (1933–2012), rosh yeshiva, Yeshivas Ohr Somayach
 Israel Zolli, Chief Rabbi of Rome, converted to Christianity

Political figures
 Muhammad Asad, Jewish religious writer who converted to Islam, Pakistani diplomat
 Isaac Deutscher, Polish-British political activist and historian
 Abba Hushi, Israeli mayor of Haifa
 Julian Klaczko, Polish-Austrian politician
 František Kriegel, Czechoslovak politician
 Walter Krivitsky, Soviet spy
 Manfred Lachs, Polish diplomat and jurist
 Pinhas Lavon, Israeli politician
 Herman Lieberman, Polish socialist politician
 Karl Radek, Bolshevik politician
 Jakob Rosenfeld, Chinese general
 Adam Daniel Rotfeld, Polish foreign affairs minister
 Dov Sadan, Israeli academic and politician
 Eliot Spitzer, former Governor of New York, Attorney General of New York
 Józef Światło, Polish intelligence officer
 Leopold Trepper, Soviet spy
 Shevah Weiss, Israeli speaker of the Kneset
 Simon Wiesenthal, hunter of Nazis
 Grigory Yavlinsky, Russian politician

Academics
 Szymon Askenazy
 Herman Auerbach
 Meir Balaban
 Georges Charpak
 Józef Feldman
 Sigmund Freud, born to Galician Jewish parents in Příbor (Moravia, then Austrian Empire)
 Henryk Grossman
 Roald Hoffmann
 Leopold Infeld
 Ludwig von Mises
 Richard von Mises
 Lewis Bernstein Namier
 Jakub Karol Parnas
 Simhah Pinsker
 Isidor Isaac Rabi
 Wilhelm Reich, psychologist 
 Jakob Rosanes
 Manfred Sakel
 Juliusz Schauder
 Hugo Steinhaus
 Adam Ulam
 Stanisław Ulam
 Michael Zohary

Cultural figures
 Harry Abend
 Shmuel Yosef Agnon
 Mordecai Ardon
 Emanuel Ax
 Erwin Axer
 Adolph Baller
 Salo Wittmayer Baron
 Chris Barron, lead singer of the Spin Doctors
Leah Bergstein (1902–1989), choreographer
 Naftule Brandwein
 Berl Broder
 Mel Brooks
 Martin Buber
 Solomon Buber
 Michael Dorfman
 Isaac Erter
 Reuven Fahn
 Emanuel Feuermann
 Karl Emil Franzos
 Ignaz Friedman
 Mordechai Gebirtig
 Maurycy Gottlieb
 Chaim Gross
 Nina Hartley
 Marian Hemar
 Jerzy Hoffman
 Moses Horowitz
 Naftali Herz Imber
 Tadeusz Kantor
 Stanisław Jerzy Lec
 Stanisław Lem
 Janusz Morgenstern
 Soma Morgenstern
 Arthur Murray
 Andrzej Munk
 Ostap Ortwin
 Teodor Parnicki
 Erna Rosenstein
 Henry Roth
 Joseph Roth
 Samuel Roth
 Heinrich Schenker
 Bruno Schulz
 Nissan Spivak
 Lee Strasberg
 Barbra Streisand
 Julian Stryjkowski
 Leopold Unger
 Billy Wilder
 David L. Wolper
 Samuel Yellin
 Velvel Zbarjer

Chess players
 Izak Aloni, born in Lviv
 Alexander Beliavsky, born in Lviv
 Oscar Chajes, born in Brody
 Arthur Dunkelblum, born in Cracow
 Salo Flohr, born in Horodenka
 Henryk Friedman, lived in Lviv
 Edward Gerstenfeld, born in Lviv
 Max Judd, born in Cracow
 Salo Landau, born in Bochnia
 Menachem Oren, lived in Cracow
 Oskar Piotrowski, lived in Lviv
 Jakob Rosanes, born in Brody
 Leon Stolzenberg, lived in Ternopil
 Oscar Tenner, born in Lviv
 Daniel Yanofsky, born in Brody

Others
 Arthur F. Burns, American economist
 Amalia Freud, mother of Sigmund Freud
 Mikhail Fridman, Russian businessman
 Gideon Hausner, Israeli jurist
 Józef Klotz, Polish footballer (soccer)
 Hersch Lauterpacht, British judge
 Julius Edgar Lilienfeld, inventor of the transistor
 Helena Rubinstein, cosmetics industrialist

See also
 Galicia (Eastern Europe)
 Hasidic Judaism
 History of the Jews in Poland
 History of the Jews in Ukraine
 Lists of Jews
 List of Poles
 List of Polish Jews
 List of Ukrainians
 List of Ukrainian Jews
 List of people from Galicia (modern period)

References

External links
 Gesher Galicia ("Bridge to Galicia")
 Jewish Encyclopedia

 
Lists of Jews
Jews,Galician (Eastern Europe)